Group A of the 2021 CONCACAF Gold Cup took place from 10 to 18 July 2021 in Arlington's AT&T Stadium, Dallas' Cotton Bowl and Frisco's Toyota Stadium. The group consisted of El Salvador, Guatemala, defending champions Mexico, and Trinidad and Tobago.

Originally, Curaçao would have played in this group. On 9 July 2021, Curaçao was removed as a participant due to close contacts with those tested positive to COVID-19 and replaced by Guatemala.

Teams

Notes

Standings

In the quarter-finals:

The winners of Group A, Mexico, advanced to play the runners-up of Group D, Honduras.
The runners-up of Group A, El Salvador, advanced to play the winners of Group D, Qatar.

Matches

Mexico vs Trinidad and Tobago

El Salvador vs Guatemala

Trinidad and Tobago vs El Salvador

Guatemala vs Mexico

Mexico vs El Salvador

Guatemala vs Trinidad and Tobago

Discipline
Fair play points would have been used as a tiebreaker should the overall and head-to-head records of teams were tied. These were calculated based on yellow and red cards received in all group matches as follows:
first yellow card: minus 1 point;
indirect red card (second yellow card): minus 3 points;
direct red card: minus 4 points;
yellow card and direct red card: minus 5 points;

Only one of the above deductions was applied to a player in a single match.

Notes

References

External links
 

Group A